Grabownica may refer to the following places in Poland:
Grabownica, Gmina Krośnice in Lower Silesian Voivodeship (south-west Poland)
Grabownica, Gmina Milicz in Lower Silesian Voivodeship (south-west Poland)
Grabownica, Świętokrzyskie Voivodeship (south-central Poland)